Josh Bell may refer to:

 Josh Bell (gridiron football) (born 1985), American football and Canadian football cornerback 
 Josh Bell (third baseman) (born 1986), American baseball third baseman
 Josh Bell (first baseman) (born 1992), American baseball first baseman

See also
Joshua Bell (disambiguation)